Betsy L. Humphreys is an American medical librarian. She was the deputy director of the National Library of Medicine from 2005 until her retirement in 2017, serving as Acting Director from 2015 to 2016.

Early life 
Betsy Humphreys was born April 26, 1947 in Lowell, Massachusetts.

Education and career 
Betsy Humphreys earned her B.A. from Smith College in 1969. She earned her M.L.S. from the University of Maryland in College Park in 1972.

Humphreys joined the National Library of Medicine (NLM) in 1973. She served on the MEDLARS III Task Force. Throughout her time at NLM, Humphreys worked to automate library processes and was instrumental in launching DOCLINE.

Humphreys negotiated the U.S. nationwide license for the clinical terminology SNOMED CT and served as founding chair for the International Health Terminology Standards Organisation.

From 2005 to June 30, 2017, Humphreys served as the National Library of Medicine's Deputy Director. Additionally, from 2015 to 2016, she served as the Acting Director, becoming the first woman and the first librarian to direct the National Library of Medicine.

Awards and honors 
She was named a Fellow of the American College of Medical Informatics in 1990. In 2008, she was named a Fellow of the Medical Library Association. Humphreys was also elected a member of the National Academy of Medicine.

She has received several awards, including the Morris F. Collen Award for Excellence from the American College of Medical Informatics, the Marcia C. Noyes Award from the Medical Library Association, the Cornerstone Award from the Association of Academic Health Sciences Libraries, and the Smith College Medal.

A LOINC code, Maestro of scalable information infrastructure, was created in her honor.

References 

American librarians
American women librarians
American bioinformaticians
1947 births
Living people
Smith College alumni
University of Maryland, College Park alumni
21st-century American women
Members of the National Academy of Medicine